Peter Richard Woolcott  (born 19 October 1953) is an Australian public servant, diplomat and the current Australian Public Service Commissioner. He was previously the Chief of Staff to Prime Minister Malcolm Turnbull. Woolcott has served as the Australia's High Commissioner to New Zealand, the Australian Ambassador for the Environment, the Australian Permanent Representative to the United Nations in Geneva, the Australian Ambassador to Italy, the Deputy Head of Mission in Jakarta, and the Consul-General in Honolulu.

Background and early life
Woolcott was born in West Berlin in 1953, the son of Richard Woolcott, a former Australian diplomat public servant. He spent October 1953 to May 1954 in Moscow, while his father was Third Secretary at the Australian Embassy in the city.

Peter Woolcott graduated with a Bachelor of Laws and Bachelor of Arts from the Australian National University and a Master of Arts degree from The Fletcher School of Law and Diplomacy.

Career
After practising as a barrister in Sydney for a number of years, Woolcott joined the Department of Foreign Affairs in 1981. He served in Australian diplomatic missions in Jamaica (1981–83), Argentina (1987–88), the Philippines as deputy head of mission (1994–97), consul-general in Honolulu and representative to United States Pacific Command (1998–2001), deputy head of mission in Jakarta (2001–2002), chief of staff to the minister for foreign affairs (2002–04), and Australian ambassador to Italy (2004–07).

In October 2008, Woolcott was one of several senior officials involved in Australia-US political-military talks. At the talks, Woolcott praised China's diplomatic efforts in south-east Asia, but said there were significant problems in the Philippines, Thailand, Malaysia, Vietnam and Burma.

Woolcott also sat on the Executive Board of the World Food Programme (2004–07). Between 2007 and 2009 he was first assistant secretary of the South East Asia division in the Department of Foreign Affairs and Trade. Woolcott was appointed as the People Smuggling envoy in 2009, leaving the job after just eight months to take up a position as Australia's ambassador to the United Nations in Geneva in 2010. In 2014 he was appointed as Australia's Ambassador for the Environment.

Woolcott was a Director for the Sea Law and Ocean Policy Group (1990–91), the Human Rights Section (1992–94) and the India and Indian Ocean Section. Woolcott has also worked as the international adviser to Bond Corporation (1989–90) and as the Executive Manager International Bid Relations, Sydney Olympic Bid 2000 Bid (1991–92).

In April 2013, under the presidency of Woolcott, the Arms Trade Treaty was adopted by the UN general assembly in New York by an overwhelming majority. This internationally commemorated success will assist in establishing internationally agreed common standards for the national regulation of the conventional arms trade and reducing the flow of unregulated arms. In 2015, Woolcott spearheaded Australia's negotiating teams at climate talks in the United Nations. He emphasized the pertinent issues of climate change: “Left unchecked, it will magnify existing problems and increase pressure on resources including land, water, energy, food and fish stocks. It has the potential to erode development gains, undermine economic growth and compound human security challenges.”

In 2017 Woolcott was appointed an Officer of the Order of Australia for distinguished service to public administration in the field of international relations through senior diplomatic roles, and as a lead negotiator in the non-proliferation and arms control fields.

Personal life
Woolcott is married to Tanya Hollows (the daughter of Fred Hollows) and has three children, Charles, Nicholas and Isabella.

References

|-

|-

|-

|-

|-

|-

1953 births
Living people
Australian public servants
Chiefs of Staff to the Prime Minister of Australia
Ambassadors of Australia to Italy
Ambassadors of Australia to San Marino
Ambassadors of Australia to Libya
Permanent Representatives of Australia to the United Nations Office in Geneva
Australian National University alumni
Officers of the Order of Australia
High Commissioners of Australia to New Zealand
High Commissioners of Australia to the Cook Islands
High Commissioners of Australia to Niue